The Over-Amorous Artist, re-released in 1975 as Just One More Time, is a 1974 British sex comedy short film, directed by Maurice Hamblin and starring John Hamill, Sue Longhurst and Hilary Pritchard. It was followed by two sequels, Girls Come First (1975) and Under the Bed (1977), which also starred Hamill in the role of Alan Street.

Plot
While his beautiful wife Sue (Sue Longhurst) is at work, Alan Street (John Hamill), a budding portrait artist, has to fend off the advances of his sex crazed female neighbours, including Bev (Hilary Pritchard), a middle-aged nymphomaniac, Carole (Claire Russell), a hippie girl, and married woman Fran (Geraldine Hart) and her daughter Barbara (Felicity Devonshire), Alan and Sue's babysitter.

Cast
  John Hamill ...  Alan Street  
  Sue Longhurst ...  Sue Street
  John Bluthal ...  Indian Salesman  
  Hilary Pritchard ...  Bev  
  Claire Russell ...  Carole  
  Felicity Devonshire ...  Barbara  
  Geraldine Hart ...  Fran  
  Jan Adair ...  Sandra  
  Marianne Morris ...  Anne  
  Bob Todd ...  Postman
 Fred Griffiths ... Window Cleaner
  Debbie Monroe ...  Au Pair
  Bobby Sparrow ...  Dancing Girl

Sequels
The film was followed by two sequels, also running around 50 minutes and both starring John Hamill as artist Alan Street. The first was Girls Come First in 1975, directed by Joseph McGrath (credited as Croisette Meubles). This played as a prequel to the original (Sue Longhurst's character, Sue, was Street's girlfriend instead of his wife, and there is no mention of their young daughter Abigail), and was set mainly in a Soho nightclub where Street is commissioned by owner Hugh Jampton (Bill Kerr) to paint nude sketches of his female models for a magazine. The cast also included Burt Kwouk, Cheryl Gilham, Rikki Howard, Heather Deeley and future singer Hazel O'Connor (credited as Hazel Glyn) in her first film role.

The third film in the series was Under the Bed in 1977, directed by David Grant and set at a wedding party. Although Hamill reprised his role as Alan Street, Longhurst did not appear in this film, and the other cast members included Theresa Wood, Jayne Lester, Brian Godfrey, Lisa Taylor and Michael Cronin. This was also the only film in the series not to receive censorship cuts by the BBFC. 

The first two films in the series were later edited together into one feature length movie which was also released as Girls Come First (with The Over Amorous Artist comprising the second half of the film).

References

External links

1974 films
1970s English-language films
British sex comedy films
1970s sex comedy films
1974 comedy films
1970s British films